is a Japanese tennis player. She reached her career-high ranking of number 40 in the world in October 2011. At junior level, she reached a combined career-high ranking of world No. 3.

Morita is known for strong and consistent two-handed groundstrokes which she hits very flat. She is also regarded as very tough mentally for a young player, often showing great resolve to win close matches despite a lackluster serve. Morita is a small and quick player with excellent footwork and movement around the court.

Morita is one of the most successful Fed Cup players of recent times with a 23–14 match win record for Japan.

Career
On September 16, 2008, she beat world No. 19, Ágnes Szávay, in three sets in the Pan Pacific Open.

In January 2009, Morita upset former Wimbledon quarterfinalist Michaëlla Krajicek in the final round of qualifying to reach the main draw of the Auckland Open. She faced third set deficits in all three of her qualifying matches, including a 4–1 deficit in her first match against Katie O'Brien.

2011
Her first tournament of the season was the ASB Classic. She faced Romanian teenager Simona Halep and lost in straight sets despite recovering from being two breaks down in the second set.
Her next tournament was the Hobart International. She beat Akgul Amanmuradova. Her next opponent was Bethanie Mattek-Sands, to whom she lost in two sets. Ayumi played at the Australian Open where she defeated No. 27 seed Alexandra Dulgheru in two sets. She defeated wildcard Caroline Garcia in the second round but lost to Peng Shuai in the third round.

At the Dubai Championships, Morita qualified by defeating Sophie Lefèvre and Vesna Manasieva. In the first round of the main draw, she defeated No. 14 seed Petra Kvitová in two tiebreaks. Before the match, Kvitová had only lost once in 2011 and had already won two titles. Morita beat wildcard Sania Mirza in the second round before losing to Caroline Wozniacki in the third round.

2013

Morita began her season at the first edition of the Shenzhen Open. She lost in the second round to sixth seed Peng Shuai. After qualifying for the Apia International Sydney, Morita reached the second round where she was defeated by fourth seed Li Na. Ranked 72 at the Australian Open, Morita reached the third round after straight-set victories over Anna Tatishvili and Annika Beck. She lost in her third-round match to third seed Serena Williams.

In Thailand at the Pattaya Open, Morita upset top seed, Ana Ivanovic, in the first round. She beat Kimiko Date-Krumm in the second to advance to the quarterfinals. She was defeated in her quarterfinal match by Nina Bratchikova. During the Fed Cup tie versus Russia, Morita won both of her rubbers over Ekaterina Makarova and Elena Vesnina. Russia ended up winning 3-2. Morita retired from her second round of qualifying match at the Dubai Championships to Jie Zheng. Seeded fourth at the Malaysian Open, Morita lost in the semifinal round to eventual champion Karolína Plíšková. In Indian Wells at the BNP Paribas Open, Morita was defeated in the first round by qualifier Lesia Tsurenko. At the Sony Open, she made it to the third round after defeating Heather Watson and 31st seed Yanina Wickmayer. She lost her third-round match to top seed and eventual champion Serena Williams. Seeded eighth at the Monterrey Open, Morita was defeated in her quarterfinal match by top seed and eventual finalist Angelique Kerber. Playing in the Fed Cup tie versus Spain, Morita lost both of her matches to Sílvia Soler Espinosa and Carla Suárez Navarro. Spain won 4-0.

Morita began her clay-court season at the Portugal Open. She was defeated in her quarterfinal match by defending champion Kaia Kanepi. Morita retired during her first-round match at the Madrid Open against Sorana Cîrstea due to a left abductor strain. She returned to action at the Italian Open. She made it to the third round beating Sorana Cîrstea and Urszula Radwańska. She retired from her third-round match against third seed Victoria Azarenka due to injury. Ranked 44 at the French Open, Morita lost in the first round to Yulia Putintseva.

Beginning her grass-court season at the Aegon Classic, Morita was defeated in the first round by qualifier Alison Van Uytvanck. In Rosmalen at the Topshelf Open, Morita lost in the first round to Sofia Arvidsson. Ranked 50 at the Wimbledon Championships, Morita was defeated in the first round by Marina Erakovic.

Starting her US Open Series at the Bank of the West Classic, Morita lost in the first round to fifth seed Sorana Cîrstea. At the Southern California Open, she was defeated in the first round by Laura Robson. Reaching the main draw as a lucky loser at the Rogers Cup, she lost in the first round to American Varvara Lepchenko. In Ohio at the Western & Southern Open, Morita was defeated in the first round of qualifying by Alison Riske. Even though she qualified for the New Haven Open at Yale, Morita retired during her first-round match against Elena Vesnina due to a low back injury. The low back injury caused her to withdraw from the US Open.

In Tokyo at the Pan Pacific Open, Morita beat Laura Robson in her first-round match. She lost in the second round to sixth seed Jelena Janković. At the HP Open, Morita was defeated in the first round by Luksika Kumkhum. Seeded fourth at the Nanjing Open, Morita made it to the final where she retired against third seed Zhang Shuai due to a left hamstring injury. Morita played her final tournament of the season at the Taipei Open. Seeded fourth, she lost in the first round to Yaroslava Shvedova.

Morita ended the year ranked 61.

2014

Morita started her 2014 season at the ASB Classic. She upset sixth seed Lucie Šafářová in the first round. In the second round, she lost to compatriot Kurumi Nara. At the Apia International Sydney, she retired during her first round of qualifying match against Tsvetana Pironkova due to injury. Ranked 61 at the Australian Open, Morita was defeated in the second round by eighth seed Jelena Janković.

In Mexico at the Monterrey Open, she retired during her second-round clash against sixth seed Magdaléna Rybáriková due to dizziness. Seeded eighth at the Malaysian Open, Morita lost in the first round to qualifier Lyudmyla Kichenok.

Grand Slam performance timelines

Singles

Doubles

WTA career finals

Doubles: 2 (2 runner-ups)

WTA 125K series finals

Singles: 1 (runner-up)

ITF Circuit finals

Singles: 19 (10 titles, 9 runner-ups)

Doubles: 7 (3 titles, 4 runner-ups)

References

External links
 
 	
 
 
 
 

1990 births
Living people
Japanese female tennis players
Olympic tennis players of Japan
People from Ōta, Gunma
Sportspeople from Gunma Prefecture
Tennis players at the 2008 Summer Olympics
Tennis players at the 2010 Asian Games
Asian Games medalists in tennis
Medalists at the 2010 Asian Games
Asian Games bronze medalists for Japan
21st-century Japanese women